General elections were held in Burma on 9 April 1947 to form the basis of a constituent assembly that would design a constitution once independence from the United Kingdom had been achieved. They were the first elections in Burma since its separation from India under the British Raj. Voter turnout was 49.8%. However, Aung San was assassinated three months later, resulting in U Nu becoming the first Prime Minister of Burma.

Background
The elections were among a number of provisions agreed on 27 January 1947 between Burmese nationalist Aung San on a visit to London and British Prime Minister Clement Attlee guaranteeing Burma's independence from the UK within a year.

Campaign
In 56 non-communal constituencies, candidates from the Anti-Fascist People's Freedom League (AFPFL) ran unopposed. U Saw, leader of the Patriot's Party, accused the AFPFL of intimidation and corruption during the election campaign and boycotted the election, as did Ba Sein and his party, accusing the AFPFL of being a "stooges" of British imperialism.  Reasons given for the low turnout included the instability left by the Japanese occupation of Burma and the struggle for independence. Other candidates in the election included a few independents and communists. The election was certified as free and fair.

Results
Turnout was generally low, around 50% in contested constituencies.

Aftermath
On 19 July 1947, Aung San was assassinated along with six other members of the party and the leadership of the AFPFL was taken over by U Nu. A constitution was approved on 24 September 1947 and independence granted on 4 January 1948.

See also
British rule in Burma
Panglong Conference

References

Elections in Myanmar
1947 in Burma
Burma
Election and referendum articles with incomplete results